The 2004 Air Canada Cup was the second edition of the women's ice hockey tournament. It was held from February 5-7, 2004 in Garmisch-Partenkirchen and Bad Tölz, Germany. The Canadian U22 national team won the tournament, going undefeated over three games.

Tournament

Results

Final table

External links
Tournament on hockeyarchives.info

2003–04
2003–04 in women's ice hockey
2003–04 in Swiss ice hockey
2003–04 in German ice hockey
2003–04 in Canadian women's ice hockey
2003–04 in Finnish ice hockey
2004